Moutohora Island (previously known as Whale Island) is a small uninhabited island located off the Bay of Plenty coast of New Zealand's North Island, about  north of the town of Whakatane. The  island is a remnant of a complex volcano which has eroded, leaving two peaks. This is still an area of volcanic activity and there are hot springs on the island in Sulphur Valley, McEwans Bay, and Sulphur Bay.

Name
The spelling "Moutohorā " (with a macron) is sometimes also used in English, although the official name of the island omits it. The spelling "Motuhora" is also used. ( is the Māori name for the southern right whale.)

History

Numerous archaeological sites of both Māori and European origin have been recorded, including an extensive pa (fortified earthworks) site on Pa Hill and a number of house terraces and garden sites, middens (food refuse dumps), stone tool manufacture areas and stone walls. After permanent Maori occupation ceased in the early nineteenth century, Ngāti Awa and Tūhoe continued to visit the island for sea food and muttonbirds and to collect stones for hāngi (underground ovens).

The first European occupation came in the 1830s with an unsuccessful attempt to establish a shore-based whaling station. The venture failed without a single whale being captured. Forty years later came attempts to make money from sulphur. It was extracted and sold to a refinery in Auckland over a number of years but was of poor quality, and the venture was abandoned in 1895. The next phase of industrial activity came in 1915, when quarrying provided rock for the construction of the Whakatane harbour wall.

Local government
The island is not included in the boundaries of a territorial authority council (district council) and the Minister of Local Government is its territorial authority, with support from the Department of Internal Affairs.

Ecology
In 1965 Moutohora was declared as a wildlife refuge, named as Moutohora Wildlife Management Reserve, and the island was bought by the Crown in 1984. Once the goats which had been introduced to the island were eradicated, a planting programme began and 12,000 plants covering 45 species are now established. Today Moutohora is covered with a mosaic of pōhutukawa, māhoe, kānuka, bracken and grassland.

There are 190 native and 110 introduced plant species. The island is now completely free of the goats, rats, cats and rabbits which previously devastated native plants and animals.  The most significant feature of Moutohora's current fauna is the breeding colony of grey-faced petrels. Sooty shearwaters, little blue penguins, the threatened New Zealand dotterel and variable oystercatchers also breed on the island. Threatened species which are occasional visitors are the Caspian tern, the North Island kaka and New Zealand falcon. Other species present include common forest birds, captive-bred red crowned parakeets, three lizard species and fur seals. Surrounding areas hosts rich marine ecosystem including cetaceans, oceanic birds, sharks. Most common of cetaceans are smaller species such as common and bottlenose dolphins, pilot whales, and killer whales while larger migratory baleen whales (southern rights and rorquals) and toothed whales including beaked whales also appear from time to time.

In March 1999 local Ngati Awa and the New Zealand Department of Conservation joined forces to see the fulfilment of a dream. Forty North Island saddleback (tieke) were transferred from Cuvier Island (Repanga), off the coast of the Coromandel Peninsula, to Moutohora.

This relocation followed the traditional flight made centuries ago when the Mataatua waka (canoe) was accompanied by two tieke from Repanga to Whakatane. This flight followed the drowning of the twin sons of Muriwai, sister of Toroa, the captain of the waka. The two tieke settled briefly on Moutohora before returning to Cuvier Island.

Access
Public access to Moutohora is restricted to Department of Conservation concession holders and approved scientific parties. During periods of high fire danger all access may be declined. The current concession holders are the local Maori tribe of Ngati Awa and three Whakatane based tourist operators - Prosail /Whale Island Kayaking, Diveworks Charters Whale Island Tours and Ngāti Awa Tourism.

In popular culture
In the fictional Harry Potter universe, Moutohora is the home of a professional Quidditch team, the Moutohora Macaws. The team players wear robes of red, yellow and blue.

The racing video game Redout hosts one of the racing complexes at Moutohora called the Volcano.

See also

 List of volcanoes in New Zealand
 List of islands of New Zealand
 List of islands
 Desert island

References

External links

 

Uninhabited islands of New Zealand
Volcanoes of the Bay of Plenty Region
Islands of the Bay of Plenty Region
Complex volcanoes
Pleistocene lava domes
Inactive volcanoes
Whaling stations in New Zealand
Whaling in New Zealand
Archaeological sites in New Zealand
Volcanic islands of New Zealand
Whakatane Graben
Taupō Volcanic Zone